Bugs! (Korean: 벅스; RR: Beogseu; formerly known as SUPER SOUND Bugs!) is a South Korean subscription digital streaming service owned by NHN Entertainment Corporation. At the end of 2016, it held a 15% share of South Korea's music streaming market according to an IFPI survey of internet users.

History
Bugs! was established in November 1999 and began operations as a subscription digital music service in February 2000. It is owned by NHN Bugs, an affiliate of South Korean IT company NHN Entertainment Corporation. By 2002, Bugs! became the largest streaming service in South Korea with over 9 million registered users.

See also
 Line Music
 Melon (online music service)
 Naver VIBE

References

External links
 

Music streaming services
Internet properties established in 2000